The hole goby (Oplopomops diacanthus) is a species of ray-finned fish from the family Gobiidae which is native to the eastern Indian Ocean and the western Pacific Ocean where it can be found down to depths of .  This fish occurs on patches of sand or rubble adjacent to reefs.  This species grows to a length of  SL.  This species is the only known member of its genus.

References

Gobiidae
Monotypic fish genera
Fish described in 1943